Guintéguéla is a town in western Ivory Coast. It is a sub-prefecture and commune of Touba Department in Bafing Region, Woroba District.
In 2014, the population of the sub-prefecture of Guintéguéla was 18,994.

Villages
The twenty two villages of the sub-prefecture of Guintéguéla and their population in 2014 are:

Notes

Sub-prefectures of Bafing Region
Communes of Bafing Region